Norwood Country Club was an exclusive golf club in West Long Branch, New Jersey during the 1920s.

External links
Description at tillinghast.net

Golf clubs and courses in New Jersey
Buildings and structures in Monmouth County, New Jersey
West Long Branch, New Jersey